Great Guns is a 1941 film directed by Monty Banks, and produced by Sol M. Wurtzel for 20th Century Fox starring Laurel and Hardy. It is also known as Forward March.

Plot
The young, spoiled but feeble Daniel Forrester IV (Dick Nelson), a very rich eligible bachelor, gets his draft notice from the US Army and is beside himself with joy, because now he has a chance to prove he does not have the weak constitution his aunts Martha (Mae Marsh) and Agatha (Ethel Griffies) believe him to have. Daniel performs well at his army physical and is enrolled in the army soon afterward.

To look after Daniel during his service, his chauffeur Ollie (Oliver Hardy) and gardener Stan (Stan Laurel) join the army at the same time. They all go to basic military training at legendary Fort Merritt in Texas. Daniel finds the army to his liking, performing excellently at the exercises, but Stan and Ollie are less happy with their new duties. Their drill sergeant, Hippo (Edmund MacDonald), considers Stan and Ollie to be lazy, and their antics drive the sergeant crazy. Stan's pet crow Penelope is a constant source of irritation to the sergeant. But what irritates Hippo most is that the fort's photo developer, Ginger Hammond (Sheila Ryan), takes a special interest in Daniel. The sergeant, who has tried to catch Ginger's heart himself for quite some time, becomes jealous of Daniel. Daniel confesses his love for her in his sleep, while Stan and Ollie listen in. They do not want Daniel to pursue Ginger, since they are not certain that his health will cope with the strain of a romantic involvement.

Stan and Ollie worry that a such relationship between the two will kill their employer, so posing as businessmen, they pay Ginger a visit at home and try to deflect her by telling her that Daniel is broke and not the catch she believes he is. She recognizes them and throws them out of her apartment. Hippo also tries to break up the loving couple by cancelling Daniel's night leave and making him a prisoner in the guard room instead.

Stan and Ollie get into trouble when they are captured by the opposing team in a military exercise. When Daniel hears about their unfortunate situation, he escapes his lock-up and uses Penelope to find Stan. Penelope helps find Stan, and the team that Stan and Ollie belong to win the maneuver. Daniel and his employees become heroes, and Daniel and Ginger become a couple. Penelope gets her own bird-size uniform and all the boys participate in a military parade together, while the aunts and Ginger watch.

Cast

Production notes
The first of Laurel and Hardy's post-Hal Roach features, Great Guns is generally regarded as the start of the team's decline, since they were given unsuitable, out-of-character scripts to work with, and very little artistic freedom. At Hal Roach Studios, Stan Laurel looked on such creativity behind as well as in front of the camera as routine, but 20th Century Fox did not allow such luxuries. Biographer John McCabe was among those who documented Laurel's unhappiness with these later films for Fox and MGM.

Alan Ladd appears briefly as a photo store customer.

References

External links

 
 
 
 
 

1941 films
1941 comedy films
American black-and-white films
1940s English-language films
Films directed by Monty Banks
Laurel and Hardy (film series)
Military humor in film
20th Century Fox films
1940s American films